Béla Szekeres (11 January 1938 in Hajdúböszörmény – 24 February 2000) was a Hungarian middle distance runner who competed in the 1960 Summer Olympics.

References

1938 births
2000 deaths
Hungarian male middle-distance runners
Olympic athletes of Hungary
Athletes (track and field) at the 1960 Summer Olympics
Universiade medalists in athletics (track and field)
Sportspeople from Hajdú-Bihar County
Universiade gold medalists for Hungary
Medalists at the 1959 Summer Universiade
Medalists at the 1963 Summer Universiade
20th-century Hungarian people